Mario Conte (born 20 July 1979 in Treviso) is an Italian politician.

He is a member of the right-wing populist Lega Nord and he has served as Mayor of Treviso since 13 June 2018.

See also 
 2018 Italian local elections
 List of mayors of Treviso
 Treviso

References

External links 
 
 

Politicians of Veneto
Venetist politicians
1979 births
Living people
Mayors of Treviso
Lega Nord politicians